Mariano Prado Baca (1776 – 1837) was a Central American lawyer and a four-time, liberal chief of state of El Salvador, while it was a state in the Federal Republic of Central America (1823–24, 1824, 1826–29 and 1832-33).

Biography
Born in Nicaragua to José de la Trinidad Prado and Clara Baca, Prado moved with his family at a young age to San Vicente, El Salvador. He spent some years in the Regiment Fijo de Bandera, but then decided to pursue a career in civil law. He received his law degree in 1797. He became a city councilman in San Vicente, where he owned considerable rural property. On June 30, 1809 he married Engracia Vasconcelos in San Vicente.

Prado repudiated the revolution of 1811. After the proclamation of independence in 1821, he opposed the union of the province of El Salvador with the Mexican Empire. He was one of the outstanding figures in the political party later called "Exaltado" (Exalted). He was a deputy in the provincial congress of 1822. As political chief of San Salvador he organized the civic militia during a time of threat to the capital by an invasion from Guatemala. (El Salvador had seceded from Guatemala in order to avoid incorporation into Mexico.) On February 7, 1823 the defenders evacuated San Salvador. Prado took command of one of the military columns in the retreat. They camped at his hacienda, "Santa Catalina", near San Vicente, and then continued to march toward Honduras. They surrendered a short time later at Gualcince.

On the fall of Emperor Agustín de Iturbide, and of the Mexican Empire itself, El Salvador regained sovereignty. Prado occupied the political leadership of San Salvador and presided over the Consultative Governmental Junta of the Province of San Salvador. He governed as provisional chief from June 17, 1823 to April 22, 1824. He served a second, brief, period as provisional chief executive of the state from October 1, 1824 to December 13, 1824.

A third term followed, from November 1, 1826 to January 30, 1829. During this period (in 1826), El Salvador broke relations with the federal government in Guatemala City. Once again, El Salvador was invaded from Guatemala, in a civil war that lasted until 1829.

He was succeeded by José María Cornejo, a conservative, who withdrew El Salvador from the Federation. This led to another invasion by federal troops, under Francisco Morazán. Morazán deposed Cornejo and put Prado back in power. During his fourth term, which lasted from July 25, 1832 to July 1, 1833, there was an Indian uprising led by Anastasio Aquino. In the church of San Vicente Aquino was crowned King of the Nonualcos.

External links
 Short biography

1776 births
1837 deaths
Presidents of El Salvador
People from León, Nicaragua